The following is a partial list of the "A" codes for Medical Subject Headings (MeSH), as defined by the United States National Library of Medicine (NLM).

This list continues the information at List of MeSH codes (A10). Codes following these are found at List of MeSH codes (A12). For other MeSH codes, see List of MeSH codes.

The source for this content is the set of 2006 MeSH Trees from the NLM.

– cells

– antibody-producing cells

– b-lymphocytes
  – b-lymphocyte subsets
  – plasma cells

– antigen-presenting cells

– dendritic cells
  – langerhans cells

– dendritic cells, follicular

– apud cells

– blastomeres

– blood cells

– blood platelets

– erythrocytes
  – erythrocyte membrane
  – erythrocytes, abnormal
  – acanthocytes
  – erythrocyte inclusions
  – heinz bodies
  – megaloblasts
  – spherocytes
  – reticulocytes

– hemocytes

– leukocytes 

  – granulocytes
  – basophils
  – eosinophils
  – neutrophils
  – leukocytes, mononuclear
  – lymphocytes
  – killer cells
  – killer cells, natural
  – killer cells, lymphokine-activated
  – lymphocyte subsets
  – b-lymphocyte subsets
  – t-lymphocyte subsets
  – b-lymphocytes
  – b-lymphocyte subsets
  – plasma cells
  – t-lymphocytes
  – cd4-positive t-lymphocytes
  – t-lymphocytes, helper-inducer
  – th1 cells
  – th2 cells
  – cd8-positive t-lymphocytes
  – t-lymphocytes, cytotoxic
  – t-lymphocyte subsets
  – lymphocytes, null
  – lymphocytes, tumor-infiltrating
  – monocytes
  – monocytes, activated killer

– bone marrow cells

– granulocytes
  – granulocyte precursor cells

– hematopoietic stem cells
  – myeloid progenitor cells
  – erythroid progenitor cells
  – erythroblasts
  – megaloblasts
  – megakaryocytes
  – reticulocytes
  – granulocyte precursor cells

– monocytes

– cells, cultured

– cell line 

  – cell line, transformed
  – cos cells
  – cell line, tumor
  – caco-2 cells
  – hct116 cells
  – hela cells
  – kb cells
  – hl-60 cells
  – ht29 cells
  – jurkat cells
  – k562 cells
  – pc12 cells
  – u937 cells
  – cho cells
  – l cells (cell line)
  – llc-pk1 cells
  – 3t3 cells
  – balb 3t3 cells
  – nih 3t3 cells
  – Swiss 3t3 cells
  – 3t3-l1 cells
  – vero cells

– clone cells
  – hybridomas

– hybrid cells
  – hybridomas

– spheroids, cellular

– tumor cells, cultured 

  – cell line, tumor
  – caco-2 cells
  – hct116 cells
  – hela cells
  – kb cells
  – hl-60 cells
  – ht29 cells
  – jurkat cells
  – k562 cells
  – pc12 cells
  – u937 cells

– cells, immobilized

– cellular structures

– cell membrane
  – cell membrane structures
  – cell-matrix junctions
  – focal adhesions
  – hemidesmosomes
  – coated pits, cell-membrane
  – caveolae
  – glycocalyx
  – intercellular junctions
  – adherens junctions
  – desmosomes
  – gap junctions
  – plasmodesmata
  – synapses
  – neuroeffector junction
  – neuromuscular junction
  – motor endplate
  – presynaptic terminals
  – synaptic membranes
  – tight junctions
  – membrane microdomains
  – caveolae
  – myelin sheath
  – nuclear envelope
  – nuclear lamina
  – phycobilisomes
  – ranvier's nodes
  – erythrocyte membrane
  – intracellular membranes
  – mitochondrial membranes
  – nuclear envelope
  – purple membrane
  – sarcolemma
  – synaptic membranes

– cell surface extensions
  – axons
  – growth cones
  – cellulosomes
  – cilia
  – dendrites
  – dendritic spines
  – growth cones
  – fimbriae, bacterial
  – flagella
  – sperm tail
  – microvilli
  – neurites
  – growth cones
  – pili, sex
  – pseudopodia

– cell wall
  – cell wall skeleton

– chromosomes
  – chromosomes, archaeal
  – chromosomes, artificial
  – chromosomes, artificial, bacterial
  – chromosomes, artificial, mammalian
  – chromosomes, artificial, human
  – chromosomes, artificial, p1 bacteriophage
  – chromosomes, artificial, yeast
  – chromosomes, bacterial
  – chromosomes, artificial, bacterial
  – chromosomes, fungal
  – chromosomes, artificial, yeast
  – chromosomes, mammalian
  – chromosomes, artificial, mammalian
  – chromosomes, artificial, human
  – chromosomes, human
  – chromosomes, artificial, human
  – chromosomes, human, 1-3
  – chromosomes, human, pair 1
  – chromosomes, human, pair 2
  – chromosomes, human, pair 3
  – chromosomes, human, 4-5
  – chromosomes, human, pair 4
  – chromosomes, human, pair 5
  – chromosomes, human, 6-12 and x
  – chromosomes, human, pair 6
  – chromosomes, human, pair 7
  – chromosomes, human, pair 8
  – chromosomes, human, pair 9
  – philadelphia chromosome
  – chromosomes, human, pair 10
  – chromosomes, human, pair 11
  – chromosomes, human, pair 12
  – chromosomes, human, x
  – chromosomes, human, 13-15
  – chromosomes, human, pair 13
  – chromosomes, human, pair 14
  – chromosomes, human, pair 15
  – chromosomes, human, 16-18
  – chromosomes, human, pair 16
  – chromosomes, human, pair 17
  – chromosomes, human, pair 18
  – chromosomes, human, 19-20
  – chromosomes, human, pair 19
  – chromosomes, human, pair 20
  – chromosomes, human, 21-22 and y
  – chromosomes, human, pair 21
  – chromosomes, human, pair 22
  – philadelphia chromosome
  – chromosomes, human, y
  – chromosomes, plant
  – isochromosomes
  – ring chromosomes
  – sex chromosomes
  – sex chromatin
  – x chromosome
  – chromosomes, human, x
  – y chromosome
  – chromosomes, human, y

– extracellular space
  – extracellular fluid
  – extracellular matrix
  – glomerular basement membrane
  – microfibrils
  – zona pellucida
  – periplasm

– inclusion bodies
  – erythrocyte inclusions
  – heinz bodies
  – inclusion bodies, viral
  – intranuclear inclusion bodies
  – lewy bodies

– intracellular space
  – cell nucleus
  – cell nucleus structures
  – intranuclear space
  – cell nucleolus
  – chromosomes
  – chromosome structures
  – centromere
  – kinetochores
  – chromatids
  – chromatin
  – euchromatin
  – heterochromatin
  – sex chromatin
  – nucleosomes
  – nucleolus organizer region
  – synaptonemal complex
  – telomere
  – coiled bodies
  – nuclear matrix
  – nuclear lamina
  – spliceosomes
  – nuclear envelope
  – nuclear lamina
  – nuclear pore
  – macronucleus
  – micronuclei, chromosome-defective
  – micronucleus, germline
  – cytoplasm
  – cytoplasmic structures
  – cytoplasmic granules
  – chromaffin granules
  – melanosomes
  – microbodies
  – glyoxysomes
  – peroxisomes
  – nissl bodies
  – weibel-palade bodies
  – cytoskeleton
  – intermediate filaments
  – microfilaments
  – stress fibers
  – microtubule-organizing center
  – centrosome
  – centrioles
  – microtubules
  – neuropil threads
  – mitotic spindle apparatus
  – myofibrils
  – neurofibrils
  – neurofibrillary tangles
  – organelles
  – bacterial chromatophores
  – cell nucleus
  – macronucleus
  – micronuclei, chromosome-defective
  – micronucleus, germline
  – cytoplasmic vesicles
  – cytoplasmic granules
  – chromaffin granules
  – melanosomes
  – microbodies
  – glyoxysomes
  – peroxisomes
  – weibel-palade bodies
  – endosomes
  – lysosomes
  – acrosome
  – phagosomes
  – transport vesicles
  – coated vesicles
  – caveolae
  – clathrin-coated vesicles
  – cop-coated vesicles
  – secretory vesicles
  – synaptic vesicles
  – vacuoles
  – endoplasmic reticulum
  – endoplasmic reticulum, rough
  – nissl bodies
  – endoplasmic reticulum, smooth
  – sarcoplasmic reticulum
  – golgi apparatus
  – trans-golgi network
  – mitochondria
  – mitochondria, liver
  – mitochondria, muscle
  – mitochondria, heart
  – submitochondrial particles
  – plastids
  – chloroplasts
  – thylakoids
  – ribosomes
  – polyribosomes
  – endoplasmic reticulum, rough
  – nissl bodies
  – sarcomeres
  – vault ribonucleoprotein particles
  – cytosol
  – intracellular fluid
  – cytosol

– subcellular fractions
  – cell-free system
  – intracellular fluid
  – cytosol
  – intracellular membranes
  – mitochondrial membranes
  – nuclear envelope
  – nuclear lamina
  – microsomes
  – microsomes, liver
  – mitochondria
  – mitochondria, liver
  – mitochondria, muscle
  – mitochondria, heart
  – submitochondrial particles
  – synaptosomes

– chromaffin cells

– pc12 cells

– connective tissue cells

– adipocytes

– chondrocytes

– fibroblasts
  – cos cells
  – l cells
  – 3t3 cells
  – balb 3t3 cells
  – nih 3t3 cells
  – Swiss 3t3 cells
  – 3t3-l1 cells
  – mesangial cells

– macrophages
  – epithelioid cells
  – foam cells
  – giant cells, foreign-body
  – giant cells, langhans
  – histiocytes
  – kupffer cells
  – macrophages, alveolar
  – macrophages, peritoneal
  – osteoclasts

– mast cells

– odontoblasts

– osteoblasts
  – osteocytes

– stromal cells

– theca cells

– epithelial cells

– ameloblasts

– caco-2 cells

– chief cells, gastric

– cho cells

– chromatophores
  – melanophores
  – melanosomes

– dendritic cells
  – langerhans cells

– endothelial cells

– enterocytes

– enteroendocrine cells
  – enterochromaffin cells
  – enterochromaffin-like cells
  – gastrin-secreting cells
  – glucagon-secreting cells
  – insulin-secreting cells
  – pancreatic polypeptide-secreting cells
  – somatostatin-secreting cells

– goblet cells

– granulosa cells

– hela cells
  – kb cells

– hepatocytes

– ht29 cells

– keratinocytes

– labyrinth supporting cells

– llc-pk1 cells

– melanocytes
  – melanosomes

– merkel cells

– neuroepithelial cells
  – neuroepithelial bodies

– paneth cells

– parietal cells, gastric

– podocytes

– sertoli cells

– vero cells

– erythroid cells

– erythrocytes
  – erythrocytes, abnormal
  – acanthocytes
  – megaloblasts
  – spherocytes

– erythroid progenitor cells
  – erythroblasts
  – megaloblasts
  – k562 cells
  – megakaryocytes
  – reticulocytes

– eukaryotic cells

– germ cells

– ovum
  – oocytes
  – oogonia
  – zona pellucida
  – zygote

– spermatozoa
  – sperm head
  – acrosome
  – sperm midpiece
  – sperm tail
  – spermatids
  – spermatocytes
  – spermatogonia

– giant cells

– giant cells, foreign-body

– giant cells, langhans

– leydig cells

– luteal cells

– muscle cells

– muscle fibers
  – muscle fibers, fast-twitch
  – muscle fibers, slow-twitch
  – myofibrils

– myocytes, cardiac

– myocytes, smooth muscle

– myeloid cells

– granulocytes
  – basophils
  – eosinophils
  – granulocyte precursor cells
  – hl-60 cells
  – neutrophils

– monocytes
  – macrophages
  – epithelioid cells
  – foam cells
  – giant cells, foreign-body
  – giant cells, langhans
  – histiocytes
  – kupffer cells
  – macrophages, alveolar
  – macrophages, peritoneal
  – osteoclasts
  – monocytes, activated killer
  – u937 cells

– myeloid progenitor cells
  – granulocyte precursor cells

– myoblasts

– myoblasts, cardiac

– myoblasts, skeletal
  – satellite cells, skeletal muscle

– myoblasts, smooth muscle

– neuroglia

– astrocytes

– microglia

– neuropil
  – neuropil threads

– oligodendroglia
  – myelin sheath

– satellite cells, perineuronal

– schwann cells
  – myelin sheath
  – neurilemma
  – ranvier's nodes

– neurons

– autonomic fibers, postganglionic
  – parasympathetic fibers, postganglionic
  – sympathetic fibers, postganglionic

– autonomic fibers, preganglionic

– axons
  – growth cones
  – mossy fibers, hippocampal
  – presynaptic terminals

– dendrites
  – dendritic spines
  – growth cones

– growth cones

– interneurons
  – amacrine cells
  – retinal bipolar cells

– lewy bodies

– nerve fibers, myelinated
  – myelin sheath
  – neurilemma
  – ranvier's nodes

– neurites

– neurofibrils
  – neurofibrillary tangles

– neurons, afferent
  – hair cells
  – hair cells, inner
  – hair cells, outer
  – hair cells, vestibular
  – olfactory receptor neurons
  – photoreceptors
  – photoreceptors, invertebrate
  – photoreceptors, vertebrate
  – cones
  – retinal ganglion cells
  – rod
  – rod outer segments
  – posterior horn cells
  – substantia gelatinosa
  – retinal ganglion cells
  – retinal horizontal cells

– neurons, efferent
  – motor neurons
  – anterior horn cells
  – motor neurons, gamma

– neuropil
  – neuropil threads

– nissl bodies

– nitrergic neurons

– purkinje cells

– pyramidal cells

– senile plaques

– oxyphil cells

– pericytes

– phagocytes

– macrophages
  – epithelioid cells
  – foam cells
  – giant cells, foreign-body
  – giant cells, langhans
  – histiocytes
  – kupffer cells
  – macrophages, alveolar
  – macrophages, peritoneal

– monocytes
  – monocytes, activated killer

– neutrophils

– prokaryotic cells

– protoplasts

– reed-sternberg cells

– spheroplasts

– stem cells

– fibroblasts

– hematopoietic stem cells
  – myeloid progenitor cells
  – erythroid progenitor cells

– mesenchymal stem cells

– multipotent stem cells

– myoblasts
  – myoblasts, cardiac
  – myoblasts, skeletal
  – satellite cells, skeletal muscle
  – myoblasts, smooth muscle

– pluripotent stem cells

– totipotent stem cells

– tumor stem cells

– trophoblasts

The list continues at List of MeSH codes (A12).

A11